Radharani Panda is an Indian politician from Bharatiya Janata Party who served as Member of Odisha Legislative Assembly from 2014 to 2019. In 2022 elections in India, she was candidate from Bharatiya Janata Party for Brajarajnagar Assembly constituency.

References 

Indian politicians
Year of birth missing (living people)
Living people
Odisha MLAs 2014–2019
Bharatiya Janata Party politicians from Odisha